The Piano Trio, Op. 8, is a composition in G minor for piano, violin and cello, by Frédéric Chopin, written in 1828 or 1829, and published in 1829, dedicated to Antoni Radziwiłł.

Structure
It has four movements:

Allegro con fuoco (G minor)
Scherzo: Vivace (G major)
Adagio sostenuto (E-flat major)
Finale: Allegretto (G minor)

A typical performance lasts approximately 25–27 minutes.

It is the only work by Chopin that features the violin (excluding orchestral parts) — an instrument to which he was somewhat indifferent, as reflected in the relative lack of sophistication of the violin parts. In a letter to his friend Tytus Woyciechowski dated 31 August 1830, Chopin speculates whether he should have written the violin line for viola, believing that the viola's timbre would "accord better with the cello". Emanuel Ax is of the opinion that it is perhaps fortunate that Chopin scored the work for a standard piano trio, since so few trios with viola exist.

References
Notes

Sources

External links 
 
 

Compositions by Frédéric Chopin
Chopin
Compositions in G minor
1830 compositions